Mykola Karpov (8 July 1929 in Poltava – 6 April 2003 in Kyiv) was a Ukrainian playwright.

Early life
Karpov took part in the Great Patriotic War (Second World War), being a sea cadet in the Black Sea Fleet at the age of 14. He graduated from the Central Komsomol School department of journalism in 1956 and from the Taras Shevchenko Kyiv State University history department in 1961.

Government career
Karpov worked for Komsomol and the Communist Party. He was editor-in-chief of the central administrative board in film production of Ministry of Culture of the Ukrainian SSR. From 1976 to 2000, he was a secretary of the Committee of the National Union of Cinematographers of Ukraine.

Works
Karpov was the author of numerous films, including:
The Duty of Everyone
Landing Force to Immortality (1965)
Commander Dybenko (1966)
Mamai Barrow
Brest Fortress
Ships are Going (1969)
We are Communists (1971)
Four Orders of Commander Fedko
The First Flag  of soviet Fleet (1979)
Young Chief (1982)

His books include:
Young Chief (1958)
Towards Storm (1960)
Through Gales and Storms (1961)
Mysterious Olena (1962)

References

Ukrainian dramatists and playwrights
1929 births
2003 deaths
20th-century dramatists and playwrights